White Cross Manor was the manor house in Lydney, Gloucestershire, England,  of the Wynter family. It was burnt to the ground in April 1645 on the orders of Sir John Wynter to avoid it being taken over by the Parliamentarians during the English Civil War.

White Cross Manor was where Edward Swarthye, a Black man, is recorded as whipping John Guye.

Another manor house, Lydney House, was later built at the other end of its grounds.

References

Manor houses in England
Buildings and structures demolished in the 17th century
Houses in Gloucestershire